Hitchin railway station serves the town of Hitchin in Hertfordshire.

Until the current Stevenage station opened in 1973, many Intercity services stopped at Hitchin.

In August 2007 Hitchin was awarded Secure Station status after improvements to station security were made by First Capital Connect, including new lighting, extra CCTV and the installation of automatic ticket gates.

History
Hitchin was one of the original stations, opening with the line on 7 August 1850.

The Midland Railway (MR) opened a route from  via  to Hitchin on 1 February 1858, by which MR trains used the GNR to reach London.

It lost its passenger service in 1961 and was closed completely in 1964, with the exception of a stub from Bedford to Cardington which itself was closed in 1969. In May 1964 part of the line was used for the railway scene in the film Those Magnificent Men in their Flying Machines. The embankment for the line could, until early 2012, still be walked from just north of the station, through the fields to Ickleford, but this section is now closed off. Opened in June 2013 a new embankment now carries a single-track line onto a viaduct for Letchworth-bound trains over the East Coast Main Line as part of the Hitchin Flyover project.

Accidents and incidents
On 14 April 1949, the solicitor and historian Reginald Hine died by suicide here by jumping in front of the slow train from Cambridge.
On 19 November 1958, a freight train overran signals and was in a rear-end collision with another. A third freight train ran into the wreckage.

Facilities

There are platforms on only the two 'Slow' lines; they are long enough for 12-car trains.

Following a refurbishment of the station by First Capital Connect in 2007, the station's subway was refurbished at a cost of £300k. The refurbishment also involved general cosmetic work throughout the station and a new high quality waiting room in the existing station buildings on Platform 2. This waiting room is fully accessible at all times through automatic doors.

The station has a large booking office with touch-screen ticket machines. The station has help points throughout.

A small shop is located by the stairs on Platform 2 and there are vending machines throughout the station.

Automatic ticket gates at the station entrance were installed by First Capital Connect during 2007.

The station's bicycle facilities were completely upgraded in 2007 and now include sheltered spaces for 68 bicycles next to the station buildings.

In 2013, Network Rail proposed plans for new lifts, one on each platform, to improve access via the existing subway for those with pushchairs or disabilities, funded through the Department for Transport's Access for All scheme. The new lifts opened in September 2014 after a two-month delay, giving step-free access to the southbound number 1 platform.

Platforms and services

Platforms
Hitchin railway station is managed by Great Northern and has two platforms situated on the slow lines. Platform 1 is used for trains towards London and a few starting/terminating services to/from London. Platform 2 is used for trains towards Peterborough and Cambridge. Platform 1 also provides access to the sidings, used for removing stone and scrap metal.

Current services
All services at Hitchin are operated by Thameslink using  EMUs.

The typical off-peak service in trains per hour is:
 2 tph to  via London Bridge,  and Gatwick Airport 
 2 tph to 

On weekends, one of the hourly services between London and Cambridge terminates at Royston. On Sundays, the services between Brighton and Cambridge and Peterborough and Horsham are reduced to hourly, with the service to Horsham terminating at London King's Cross.

Future services
It is proposed that a two trains per hour service from Cambridge to  via  and  will begin operating once the Thameslink Programme is fully complete. This would see the existing Cambridge to London service extended through the Thameslink Core and down to Maidstone.

However this proposal was cancelled and replaced with the Maidstone East service.

This service was due to commence in December 2019 but has now been postponed to an unknown date.

Junction development

Down trains from London to Cambridge used to use a ladder crossing over the up lines in order to reach the Cambridge Line, which often caused significant delays to trains in both directions.

In June 2013 Network Rail completed a flyover to carry Down trains to Cambridge over the top of the main line, built at a final cost of £47million

References

External links

 Hitchin: Here we explain our plans to improve the rail links between London, Hitchin and Cambridge on Network Rail website

Railway stations in Hertfordshire
DfT Category C2 stations
Former Great Northern Railway stations
Railway stations served by Govia Thameslink Railway
Railway stations in Great Britain opened in 1850
Hitchin
Buildings and structures in Hitchin
Rail junctions in England
Train driver depots in England